Sivas bar,,, is a form of the Anatolian folk dance Kaşık Havası or (halay)(yallı). The meter is 2/4.
The original form of the folk dance Kaşık Havası was popular in Sivas, Malatya and Kemaliye.There are similar folkloric tunes known as Konyalım Yaman Çalar Şak Şak Kaşığı .

External links

See also 
Halay
Kochari
Amanın Yalel Yalel

References

Turkish dances
Armenian dances
Sivas
Malatya
Kemaliye